Larry Flewwelling (born 9 August 1965) is a Canadian former diver. He competed in the men's 3 metre springboard event at the 1988 Summer Olympics.

References

External links
 

1965 births
Living people
Canadian male divers
Olympic divers of Canada
Divers at the 1988 Summer Olympics
People from Kentville, Nova Scotia
Sportspeople from Nova Scotia
Commonwealth Games medallists in diving
Commonwealth Games bronze medallists for Canada
Divers at the 1990 Commonwealth Games
Medallists at the 1990 Commonwealth Games